Love and Trumpets is a 1954 West German musical comedy film directed by Helmut Weiss and starring Hans Holt, Nadja Tiller and Marianne Koch. It was shot at the Bavaria Studios in Munich and on location around Sirmione on Lake Garda in Italy. The film's sets were designed by the art director Ludwig Reiber.

Cast
 Hans Holt as Peter von Salis
 Nadja Tiller as Ninon Careli Star
 Marianne Koch as Bettina von Brixen
 Adolf Gondrell as Stahl
 Krista Keller as Therese
 Franz Muxeneder as Hupp
 Gunnar Möller as Nikolaus von Laffen
 Brigitte Rau
 Willy Reichert
 Sepp Rist
 Edith Schultze-Westrum as Frau von Barro
 Helen Vita
 Ernst Waldow as Oberst von Küchlin
 Helmut Weiss as Der Grossherzog Heinrich XVIII

References

Bibliography 
 Hans-Michael Bock and Tim Bergfelder. The Concise Cinegraph: An Encyclopedia of German Cinema. Berghahn Books.

External links 
 

1954 films
1954 musical comedy films
German musical comedy films
West German films
1950s German-language films
Films directed by Helmut Weiss
German black-and-white films
1950s German films
Films shot at Bavaria Studios
Films shot in Italy